Miguel Ángel Leyes (born 5 February 1952 in Buenos Aires, Argentina) is an Argentine naturalised Chilean former footballer and current manager who played for clubs in Argentina, Chile, Mexico and Ecuador.

Teams

As player
 Huracán 1971–1975
 LDU Quito 1976
 Atlético Potosino 1976–1977
 Everton 1977–1978
 O'Higgins 1979–1980
 Colo-Colo 1981
 Universidad Católica 1982–1983
 Huracán 1984

As manager
 Rangers de Talca 1989
 Everton 1990

Honours
 Huracán
 Primera División Argentina - Campeonato Metropolitano: 1973, 1975

 Colo-Colo
 Chilean Primera División Championship: 1981

External links
 Profile at BDFA 

1952 births
Living people
Footballers from Buenos Aires
Argentine footballers
Argentine expatriate footballers
Argentine emigrants to Chile
Naturalized citizens of Chile
Chilean footballers
Chilean expatriate footballers
Club Atlético Huracán footballers
L.D.U. Quito footballers
Atlético Potosino footballers
Everton de Viña del Mar footballers
O'Higgins F.C. footballers
Colo-Colo footballers
Club Deportivo Universidad Católica footballers
Argentine Primera División players
Ecuadorian Serie A players
Liga MX players
Chilean Primera División players
Argentine expatriate sportspeople in Ecuador
Argentine expatriate sportspeople in Mexico
Argentine expatriate sportspeople in Chile
Expatriate footballers in Ecuador
Expatriate footballers in Mexico
Expatriate footballers in Chile
Association football goalkeepers
Pan American Games gold medalists for Argentina
Medalists at the 1971 Pan American Games
Footballers at the 1971 Pan American Games
Pan American Games medalists in football
Argentine football managers
Argentine expatriate football managers
Expatriate football managers in Chile
Chilean football managers
Rangers de Talca managers
Everton de Viña del Mar managers
Chilean Primera División managers